In Satmar Custody is a 2003 film of the Jaradis, a Yemenite Jewish family, one of many that were brought from Yemen to the US (Monroe, New York) by the Hasidic Satmar community, which advises against immigration to Israel. The story exposes a deep cultural gap between the Yemenite families and the Yiddish Satmar community that became distractive and tragic to families who have traveled thousands of miles to a place with strange rules, norms, morals, and lifestyles. The film follows the life of Yahia and Lauza Jaradi, who were brought from Yemen into the Satmar community. It starts on the day that the Jaradi couple received an urgent phone call notifying that their two-and-a-half-year-old daughter, Hadia, died in a hospital in Paterson, New Jersey. Through their search for their daughter's body, they are getting closer and closer to what seems as the very painful truth about her faith.

External links

2003 films
Israeli independent films
2000s Hebrew-language films
Documentary films about Jews and Judaism in the United States
Satmar (Hasidic dynasty)
Yemeni-American culture
Yemeni-Jewish diaspora
Films about Orthodox and Hasidic Jews
Anti-Orthodox Judaism sentiment